Cuyotenango is a town and municipality in the Suchitepéquez department of Guatemala.

Cuyotenango was founded around the 16th century, and its name in Nahuatl literally means "Fortification of the Coyote", a name given by the Mexican soldiers accompanying Pedro de Alvarado, the Spanish conquistador of Guatemala. There is a beach called Tulate, a vacation spot of Semana Santa (Holy Week).

References

 

Municipalities of the Suchitepéquez Department